Anolis pecuarius, the Île-à-Vache green anole, is a species of lizard in the family Dactyloidae. The species is found on Île-à-Vache in Haiti.

References

Anoles
Reptiles described in 1969
Endemic fauna of Haiti
Reptiles of Haiti
Taxa named by Albert Schwartz (zoologist)